Sir Samuel Cooke, 1st Baronet (c.1690 – 9 February 1758) was an Anglo-Irish politician. 

On 28 December 1741, Cooke was created a baronet, of Dublin in the Baronetage of Ireland. He was the Member of Parliament for Dublin City in the Irish House of Commons between 1749 and his death in 1758, when his title became extinct.

References

Year of birth unknown
1758 deaths
18th-century Anglo-Irish people
Baronets in the Baronetage of Ireland
Irish MPs 1727–1760
Members of the Parliament of Ireland (pre-1801) for County Dublin constituencies